"I Wanna Dance" is a 2013 Japanese single by Korean boy band Super Junior's sub-group, Donghae & Eunhyuk.

"I Wanna Dance" may also refer to:

Music

Albums
I Wanna Dance, 1978 album by Baby Washington
I Wanna Dance, 2014 album by Đông Nhi

Songs
"I Wanna Dance", 1972 song by John Holt, B-side of "The Further You Look"
"I Wanna Dance", 1977 single by Alan Price
"I Wanna Dance", 1981 single by Kat Mandu 
"I Wanna Dance", 1984 single by The Cool Notes
"I Wanna Dance", 1993 single by Melodie MC
"I Wanna Dance", 1981 single by Memphis Slim
"I Wanna Dance", 1992 song by La India from the album Llegó La India Vía Eddie Palmieri
"I Wanna Dance", 1993 song by Michael Learns to Rock from the album Colours
"I Wanna Dance", 2001 song by Willy Chirino from the album Afro-Disiac
"I Wanna Dance", 2003 song by Orquesta Mondragón, reissued on 2005 greatest hits collection Grandes Éxitos: Orquesta Mondragón
"I Wanna Dance Wit' Choo (Doo Dat Dance)", 1975 single by Disco-Tex and the Sex-O-Lettes
"I Wanna Dance with Somebody (Who Loves Me)", 1987 single by Whitney Houston
"I Wanna Dance (Cần một ai đó)", 2014 song by Đông Nhi from the album I Wanna Dance